J. J. Wolf was the defending champion but chose not to defend his title.

Raúl Brancaccio won the title after defeating Laurent Lokoli 4–6, 7–5, 6–2 in the final.

Seeds

Draw

Finals

Top half

Bottom half

References

External links
Main draw
Qualifying draw

Open de Nouvelle-Calédonie - 1
2023 Singles